In the mathematical field of graph theory, a distance-transitive graph is a graph such that, given any two vertices  and  at any distance , and any other two vertices  and  at the same distance, there is an automorphism of the graph that carries  to  and  to . Distance-transitive graphs were first defined in 1971 by Norman L. Biggs and D. H. Smith.

A distance-transitive graph is interesting partly because it has a large automorphism group.  Some interesting finite groups are the automorphism groups of distance-transitive graphs, especially of those whose diameter is 2.

Examples 
Some first examples of families of distance-transitive graphs include:
 The Johnson graphs.
 The Grassmann graphs.
 The Hamming Graphs.
 The folded cube graphs.
 The square rook's graphs.
 The hypercube graphs.
 The Livingstone graph.

Classification of cubic distance-transitive graphs 
After introducing them in 1971, Biggs and Smith showed that there are only 12 finite trivalent distance-transitive graphs. These are:

Relation to distance-regular graphs 
Every distance-transitive graph is distance-regular, but the converse is not necessarily true.

In 1969, before publication of the Biggs–Smith definition, a Russian group led by Georgy Adelson-Velsky showed that there exist graphs that are distance-regular but not distance-transitive. The smallest distance-regular graph that is not distance-transitive is the Shrikhande graph, with 16 vertices and degree 6. The only graph of this type with degree three is the 126-vertex Tutte 12-cage. Complete lists of distance-transitive graphs are known for some degrees larger than three, but the classification of distance-transitive graphs with arbitrarily large vertex degree remains open.

References

Early works
.
.
.
.
.

Surveys
, chapter 20.
.
, chapter 7.
.
, section 4.5.
.

External links

Algebraic graph theory
Graph families
Regular graphs